G3, or the Good Governance Group, is a strategic advisory consultancy which specialises in providing advice on risk mitigation, governance, cyber security and regulatory compliance.

History

The company was set up in 2004 by two former senior executives from Kroll Inc. For a period of time it was owned by Kinnevik and it was then subject to a management buyout.

In 2011, it was reported that the company was linked to an incident involving Adam Werritty, that led to the resignation of former UK Secretary of State for Defence Liam Fox.

In 2012, it was reported that the Group had received £1.5 million from the government of Bahrain for "a media campaign to support the Kingdom of Bahrain's stance before the international community", during the Bahraini uprising.

In June 2012, Proven acquired Palmer Legal Technologies, a provider of e-discovery and digital forensics services to litigation and dispute resolution teams involved in commercial litigation, internal compliance reviews and regulatory investigations.

Background
The firm has offices in London and New York City and works with multinational corporations and financial institutions on dispute resolution, regulation and compliance, cyber security, reputation management, integrity due diligence and corporate social responsibility.

The company also provides intelligence for businesses, such as competitor analysis and cyber security, including for the defence contractor BAE Systems. The company was reported to be worth £20 million in 2011.

Services
 Strategic advice - Advice on commercial, geographic or political considerations in M&A transactions or expansion into new business sectors or territories
 Integrity due diligence – Pre-transactional due diligence on public or private entities or individuals to assess suitability of potential business partners
 Political and business risk management – Advice on challenging emerging or developed markets focused on anticipating and interpreting political, legal or regulatory events, trends or decisions that could affect business interests
 Dispute resolution – support to businesses engaged in complex, high value cases in multiple global jurisdictions, involving fraud, corruption, internal and regulatory investigations, asset profiling, and anti-bribery/corruption compliance
 E-disclosure and digital forensics – specialist e-disclosure, regulatory investigation and digital forensic services that include data mapping and collection
 Information and cyber security – advice on the optimisation of information security strategies and systems to enhance business opportunities and protect critical information infrastructure, including cyber security, digital investigations and online reputation
 Reputational intelligence – advice on the management and safeguarding of reputations

Advisers
 Helen Liddell, Baroness Liddell of Coatdyke 
 Jacques Battistella – former roles in leading international firms like Matra, Aerospatiale and EADS. He is a member of the scientific advisory committee to the French minister of defence.
 Dr. Chet Crocker - former US Secretary of State for African Affairs and former chairman and board member of the United States Institute for Peace. He is also a founding member of the Global Leadership Foundation and is the James R. Schlesinger professor of strategic studies at Georgetown University.
 Gareth Bullock - former group executive director of Standard Chartered, holding a number of positions at the bank over the years including CEO of Africa, group CIO, and head of strategy. He is also a trustee of the British Council. 
 Tim Clark - former senior partner at Slaughter and May between 2001 and 2008. He is currently a non-executive director of Big Yellow Group, a board member of the Royal National Theatre, a senior advisor for Chatham House and the chairman of the Economic Trust, among other roles.
 Edward Chaplin - former British diplomat  who spent much of his career in the Middle East, including as British Ambassador to Jordan, director of the Middle East and North Africa in London, and British Ambassador to Iraq. He has also been British Ambassador to Italy.
 Lord David Gold - one of the UK’s leading litigation lawyers and founder of David Gold & Associates litigation advisors. He was formerly a senior litigation partner at Herbert Smith LLP.
 Dr. August Hanning - former senior official in German and European security and intelligence with an expertise in European politics emanating from his time as state secretary for the interior.
 Anthony Rowell - former Foreign Service diplomat with experience in Europe and Africa. After his diplomatic roles, he joined the British defence company Racal Electronics.
 Sir Stephen Wright - former diplomat until 2008, most recently as British Ambassador to Spain. He has also held roles as director general of defence and intelligence in the Foreign and Commonwealth Office in London, as well as minister and deputy head of mission at the British Embassy in Washington.

References

External links
 G3 website
 Proven Legal Technologies

Business services companies of the United Kingdom